This is a list of diplomatic missions of Sierra Leone, excluding honorary consulates. Sierra Leone is a small West African country. Its worldwide diplomatic presence is very small.

Current missions

Africa

Americas

Asia

Europe

Multilateral organizations

Gallery

Non-resident diplomatic missions (Unverified)

Resident in Moscow

Resident in Nairobi

Resident in New York City

Resident in other cities 

 (Dakar)
 (Abuja)
 (Addis Ababa)
 (Cairo)
 (Abuja)
 (Geneva)
 (Conakry/Dakar)
 (London)
 (Tehran)
 (Abu Dhabi)
 (Beijing)
 (Abu Dhabi)
 (Beijing)
 (Abuja)
 (Tehran)

Closed missions

Africa

Americas

See also
 Foreign relations of Sierra Leone
 List of diplomatic missions in Sierra Leone
 Visa policy of Sierra Leone

References

Ministry of Foreign Affairs of Sierra Leone

Sierra Leone
Diplomatic missions